You Don't Know Jack is a video game released in 1995, and the first release in the You Don't Know Jack video game series.

History
Jellyvision's website has this explanation as to why You Don't Know Jack was made:

"Way back in the early 90s, Jellyvision decided to test the waters of mainstream interactive entertainment by beginning a partnership with Berkeley Systems, of "Flying Toasters" fame. Berkeley Systems asked us if we could apply the concepts of a game show to an adult trivia game. Since no one at Jellyvision at the time actually liked trivia games, we tried to figure out how to make trivia questions fun and engaging to us. When we realized that it was possible to ask about both Shakespeare and Scooby-Doo in the same question, You Don't Know Jack was born."

Reception

Sales of You Don't Know Jack surpassed 250,000 units by May 1996. According to market research firm PC Data, it was the 17th-best-selling computer game in the United States that year.

Reviewing the Macintosh version of the original You Don't Know Jack, a Next Generation critic praised the social nature of the game and the witty presentation. Calling it "An excellent, hip piece of work", he gave it three out of five stars. MacUser named You Don't Know Jack the best strategy game of 1995. Less favorably, Ed Lomas of Computer and Video Games found the title enjoyable, also felt the PC game format was unsuitable for an "after-pub game" like You Don't Know Jack: "there aren't going to be many people who will want to bother setting up their PC after a drinking session." To Lomas, it also did not help the jokes felt labored, "the kind of humour that will only appeal to 35-year-olds who think Hale and Pace are funny".

You Don't Know Jack won Computer Gaming Worlds award for the best "Classics/Puzzles" game of 1995. The editors wrote that "it's great fun watching people whiff on answers at parties", and that "anyone who's ever wanted to see game shows skewered will have a ball with this." It won Computer Game Reviews 1995 "Puzzle Game of the Year" award. The editors wrote, "You Don’t Know Jack did more than simply provide a fun way to spend time at the computer. It also broke a lot of conventions including the need for flashy graphics to have an exciting game." You Don't Know Jack also received Computer Game Reviews "Best Voiceover Work of the Year" prize.

In 1996, Computer Gaming World declared You Don't Know Jack the 75th-best computer game ever released.

You Don't Know Jack XL
You Don't Know Jack XL compiles the first You Don't Know Jack volume with an additional Question Pack.

You Don't Know Jack XL won Macworlds 1996 "Best Party Game" award. Steven Levy of the magazine wrote, "When it comes to creating a great party game that works on the computer, many have tried, and most have failed. Finally, fueled by MTV energy and Generation X cultural radar, there's You Don't Know Jack." It also won the 1996 Spotlight Awards for "Best Trivia or Puzzle Game" and "Best Script, Story or Interactive Writing" from the Game Developers Conference. The game received a score of 4.5 out of 5 from MacUser, whose editors named it one of 1996's top 50 CD-ROMs.

References

1995 video games
Classic Mac OS games
PlayStation (console) games
Video games developed in the United States
Windows games
You Don't Know Jack (franchise)